Steven James Hitchen (born 28 November 1976) is an English retired professional footballer who played as a defender for Blackburn Rovers and Macclesfield Town in the Football League. He is the former Director of Technical Performance for Tottenham Hotspur.

Career
Hitchen was born in Salford, England. A defender, he played for Blackburn Rovers and Macclesfield Town in the Football League and Bangor City.

After his playing career ended, he worked as a football talent scout . He started at Tottenham Hotspur in the mid-2000s as a part-time European scout, and played a part in the signings of Luka Modrić and Benoît Assou-Ekotto. He moved to Liverpool in 2010 to join Damien Comolli who was once his superior as the director of football at Tottenham. He helped signed Luis Suárez to Liverpool in 2011. He then became head of European scouting for Queens Park Rangers, and in 2016 joint director of recruitment at Derby County. He was appointed the chief scout for Tottenham Hotspur in February 2017 as a replacement for Paul Mitchell and left the club in February 2022.

References

External links

1976 births
Living people
Footballers from Salford
English footballers
Association football defenders
Blackburn Rovers F.C. players
Macclesfield Town F.C. players
Bangor City F.C. players
English Football League players
Queens Park Rangers F.C. non-playing staff
Tottenham Hotspur F.C. non-playing staff